Ivanovka is a rural locality (a selo) in Kyakhtinsky District, Republic of Buryatia, Russia. The population was 177 as of 2010. There is 1 street.

Geography 
Ivanovka is located 76 km southeast of Kyakhta (the district's administrative centre) by road. Enkhe-Tala is the nearest rural locality.

References 

Rural localities in Kyakhtinsky District